The Xavier Institute is a fictional school in the X-Men universe. This list documents the fictional staff, students and alumni of the institute.

Xavier's School for Gifted Youngsters
 Later renamed as Xavier Institute for Higher Learning.

Former Staff Members
Alicia Downing - Guidance counselor.
Angel/Archangel (Warren Worthington III) - Flight class instructor. Current member of X-Corp on Krakoa.
Annie Ghazikhanian - School nurse; left the school during an attack by the Brotherhood of Mutants.
Beast (Dr. Henry "Hank" McCoy) - Science teacher and mentor of the Exemplars. Current member of X-Force on Krakoa.
Colossus (Piotr Rasputin) - Art teacher; current member of Quiet Council of Krakoa.
Cyclops (Scott Summers) - Headmaster, geometry/Leadership and tactics teacher and mentor of Corsairs. Current member of X-Men and one of the Great Captains of Krakoa.
Gambit (Remy LeBeau) - Mentor of Chevaliers. Current member of Excalibur on Krakoa.
Iceman (Robert "Bobby" Drake) -  Omega-level mutant. Math/Accounting teacher and mentor of Excelsiors. Current member of X-Men on Krakoa.
Karma (Mạnh Cao Xuân) - Secretary to the headmaster, teacher of lower school, librarian, French teacher and replacement mentor of Alpha Squadron. Current member of New Mutants on Krakoa.
Magma (Amara Aquilla) - Geology teacher and replacement mentor of Paragons. Current member of New Mutants on Krakoa.
Magneto (Max Eisenhardt/Erik "Magnus" Lehnsherr) - Omega-level mutant. Former headmaster. Founder of Krakoa nation; currently deceased.
Marilyn Hannah - Former Xavier Institute chef. Killed by Black Tom Cassidy during the Brotherhood's attack.
Mirage (Danielle Moonstar) - American history teacher and mentor of New Mutants squad. Depowered due to the events of M-Day and fired by White Queen; Later re-powered and current member of New Mutants on Krakoa.
Moira MacTaggert - Housekeeper and lover of Professor X. Founder of Krakoa nation; current member of anti-mutant Orchis.
Nightcrawler (Kurt Wagner) - Drama teacher. Current member of Quiet Council of Krakoa and Legionaries.
Northstar (Jean-Paul Beaubier) - Former Business/Flight teacher and mentor of Alpha Squadron. Current member of X-Factor Investigations on Krakoa.
Phoenix (Jean Grey) (now Marvel Girl) - Omega-level mutant. Former headmistress. Current member of X-Men on Krakoa.
Professor X (Charles Xavier) - Former headmaster. Current member of Quiet Council and founder of Krakoa nation.
Shadowcat (Katherine "Kate" Pryde) (now Red Queen) -  Computer Science teacher and mentor of Paladins. Current member of Quiet Council of Krakoa and Marauders.
Rogue (Anne Marie) - Mentor of Advocates. Current resident of Krakoa.
Sanji Yamamoto - Member of the kitchen staff.
Sharon Friedlander - Former school nurse; currently deceased.
Stevie Hunter - Dance instructor; currently politician.
Storm (Ororo Munroe) - Omega-level mutant. Mentor of her squad. Current member of Quiet Council of Krakoa, Great Ring of Arakko and Brotherhood of Arakko.
Tom Corsi - Physical education teacher.
White Queen (Emma Frost) - Headmistress, Ethics teacher and mentor of Hellions. Current member of the Quiet Council of Krakoa.
Wolfsbane (Rahne Sinclair) - Former mentor of Paragons and teaching assistant. Current member of New Mutants on Krakoa.
Wolverine (James Howlett/Logan) - Combat instructor; current member of X-Force on Krakoa.
Xorn (Kuan Yin-Xorn) -  Mentor of Special Class. Current member of Legionaries on Krakoa.

Former Student Body

Original X-Men
First group of students trained and graduated by Professor X.
Angel (Warren Worthington III)
Beast (Henry "Hank" McCoy)
Cyclops (Scott Summers)
Iceman (Robert "Bobby" Drake)
Marvel Girl (Jean Grey)

Subsequent Students of Professor X
Sage (Tessa) - Trained secretly and sent to spy Hellfire Club. Current member of X-Force on Krakoa.
Havok (Alexander "Alex" Summers) - Enrolled after the original X-Men. Current member of X-Men on Krakoa.
Polaris (Lorna Dane) - Enrolled after the original X-Men. Current member of X-Factor on Krakoa.
Vulcan (Gabriel Summers) - Omega-level mutant. Trained to rescue the original X-Men team trapped on the mutant island Krakoa. Current resident of Krakoa.
Petra - Trained to rescue the original X-Men team trapped on the mutant island Krakoa. Current resident of Krakoa.
Sway - Trained to rescue the original X-Men team trapped on the mutant island Krakoa. Current resident of Krakoa.
Darwin (Armando Muñoz) - Trained to rescue the original X-Men team trapped on the mutant island Krakoa. Current resident of Krakoa.
Shadowcat (Katherine "Kate" Pryde) - Enrolled after the original X-Men.
Jubilee (Jubilation "Jubes" Lee) - Enrolled after the original X-Men. Later joined Massachusetts Academy to join Generation X. Current member of Excalibur on Krakoa.

Original New Mutants
Second group of students trained by Professor X and later Magneto in his absence.
Cannonball (Samuel "Sam" Guthrie) - Current resident of Krakoa.
Cypher (Douglas "Doug" Ramsey) - Current member of Quiet Council and New Mutants on Krakoa.
Karma (Mạnh Cao Xuân)
Magik (Illyana Rasputin) - Current member of New Mutants, X-Men, Great Captains of Krakoa.
Magma (Amara Aquilla)
Mirage (Danielle "Dani" Moonstar)
Sunspot (Roberto da Costa) - Current member of Great Ring of Arakko and Brotherhood of Arakko; also resident of Krakoa.
Warlock - Currently an accessory to Cypher on Krakoa.
Wolfsbane (Rahne Sinclair)

Subsequent New Mutants
Rusty (Russell Collins) - Enrolled after the original New Mutants. Killed by Holocaust but resurrected on Krakoa.
Boom-Boom (Tabitha Smith) - Enrolled after the original New Mutants. Current member of X-Terminators on Krakoa.
Rictor (Julio Esteban Richter) - Enrolled after the original New Mutants. Current member of Knights of X on Krakoa.
Skids (Sally Blevins) - Enrolled after the original New Mutants. Current mutant/island relations ambassador on Krakoa.

Special Class
These students included those with special educational needs that required some remedial study. Mentored by Xorn.
Tempest (Angel Salvadore) - Formerly depowered as a result of M-Day. Current resident of Krakoa.
Beak (Barnell Bohusk) - Formerly depowered as a result of M-Day. Current resident of Krakoa.
Basilisk (Mike Columbus) - Killed by Xorn.
Dummy (Dean Boswell) - Killed during the Riot at Xaviers.
Ernst
No-Girl (Martha Johansson) (now Cerebella) - Current member of Lost Club on Krakoa.

Omega Gang
Glob Herman (Robert Herman) - Current member of Legionaries on Krakoa.
Kid Omega (Quintavius "Quentin" Quire) - Omega-level mutant. Former member of X-Factor on Krakoa. Currently deceased.
Radian (Christian Cord) - Depowered as a result of M-Day.
Redneck (Vincent Stewart) - Depowered as a result of M-Day. Currently deceased.
Tattoo (Christine Cord) - Depowered as a result of M-Day. Currently deceased.

Advocates
Mentored by Rogue.
 Boggart (Robin Wise) - Depowered as a result of M-Day. Possibly killed on a bus when it exploded but resurrected on Krakoa.
 Naiad (Aurelie Sabayon) - Depowered as a result of M-Day. Possibly killed on a bus when it exploded but resurrected on Krakoa.
 Pinpoint (Gerard Cooper) - Depowered as a result of M-Day. Possibly killed on a bus when it exploded but resurrected on Krakoa.
 Trovao (Pedro de Noli) - Depowered as a result of M-Day. Possibly killed on a bus when it exploded but resurrected on Krakoa.
 Umbra (Patrick Nesbitt) - Depowered as a result of M-Day. Possibly killed on a bus when it exploded but resurrected on Krakoa.
 Xenon (Shaun Kennedy) - Depowered as a result of M-Day. Possibly killed on a bus when it exploded but resurrected on Krakoa.

Alpha Squadron
Mentored by Northstar. After his death, Karma was assigned as new mentor.
Anole (Victor "Vic" Borkowski) - Current member of Lost Club on Krakoa.
Rubbermaid (Andrea Marguiles) - Depowered as a result of M-Day. Killed on a bus when it exploded but resurrected on Krakoa.
Indra (Paras Gavaskar) - Current resident of Krakoa.
Loa (Alani Ryan) - Current resident of Krakoa.
Kidogo (Lazaro Kotikash) - Depowered as a result of M-Day.
Network (Sarah Vale) - Depowered as a result of M-Day. Killed on a bus when it exploded but resurrected on Krakoa.

Chevaliers
Mentored by Gambit.
Flubber (Nick Shelley) - Depowered as a result of M-Day. Killed on a bus when it exploded but resurrected on Krakoa.
Onyxx (Sidney Green) - Killed by Mortis but resurrected on Krakoa.
Bling! (Roxanne "Roxy" Washington) - Current resident of Krakoa.
Rain Boy (Carl Aalston) - Depowered as a result of M-Day. Killed on a bus when it exploded but resurrected on Krakoa. Current member of Lost Club.
Foxx - Revealed to be Mystique in disguise to seduce Gambit.

Corsairs
Mentored by Cyclops.
Quill (Maxwell Jordan) - Killed by Reverend Stryker's Purifiers but resurrected on Krakoa.
Stepford Cuckoos/Five-In-One - Current resident of Krakoa, working with the Hellfire Trading Company.
Celeste Cuckoo (now White Queen)
Esme Cuckoo (now White Queen)
Sophie Cuckoo (now White Queen)
Phoebe Cuckoo (now White Queen)
Irma "Mindee" Cuckoo (now White Queen)
Dryad (Callie Betto) - Depowered as a result of M-Day. Killed on a bus when it exploded but resurrected on Krakoa.
Specter (Dallas Gibson) - Lived at home with his grandfather, after being depowered as a result of M-Day. Current resident of Krakoa.

Hellions

Mentored by White Queen.
Hellion (Julian Keller) - Current resident of Krakoa.
Tag (Brian Cruz) - Depowered as a result of M-Day. Killed on a bus when it exploded but resurrected on Krakoa.
Rockslide (Santo Vaccarro) - Killed by High Summoner.
Dust (Sooraya Qadir) - Current member of Legionaries on Krakoa.
Mercury (Cessily Kincaid) - Current resident of Krakoa.
Wither (Kevin Ford) - Killed by Elixir but resurrected on Krakoa.

Paladins
Mentored by Shadowcat.
Armor (Hisako Ichiki) - Current member of S.W.O.R.D. on Krakoa and Arrako.
Blindfold (Ruth Aldine) - Current member of Legionaries on Krakoa.
Wing (Edward "Eddie" Tancredi) - Depowered as a result of M-Day. Killed on a bus when it exploded but resurrected on Krakoa.

Paragons
Originally mentored by Wolfsbane; she left after it was revealed that she had been romantically involved with a student. Karma became temporary mentor before being replace by Magma.
Wolf Cub (Nicholas "Nick" Gleason) - Killed by Donald Pierce but resurrected on Krakoa.
Match (Benjamin "Ben" Hamill) - Current resident of Krakoa.
Pixie (Megan Gwynn) - Current member of Legionaries on Krakoa.
Preview (Jessica Vale) - Depowered as a result of M-Day. Killed on a bus when it exploded but resurrected on Krakoa.
DJ (Mark Sheppard) - Depowered as a result of M-Day. Killed on a bus when it exploded but resurrected on Krakoa.
Trance (Hope Abbott) - Current resident of Krakoa.

New Mutants Training Squad
Mentored by Mirage.
Prodigy (David Alleyne) - Depowered as a result of M-Day. Later murdered but resurrected on Krakoa, serving with X-Factor.
Elixir (Josh Foley) - Omega-level mutant; current member of the Five on Krakoa.
Icarus (Joshua "Jay" Guthrie) - Killed by William Stryker but resurrected on Krakoa.
Wind Dancer (Sofia Mantega) - Depowered as a result of M-Day. Later killed in Mojoverse but resurrected on Krakoa, serving X-Corp.
Surge (Noriko Ashida) - Current resident of Krakoa.
Wallflower (Laurie Collins) - Killed by Reverend Stryker's Purifiers but resurrected on Krakoa.

Storm's squad
Gentle (Nezhno Abidemi) -  Wakandan heritage; current resident of Krakoa.

Lower School
Jeffrey Garrett - Killed during the destruction of the Xavier Institute but remained as a ghost due to secondary mutation. Depowered and vanished as a result of M-Day.
Leong Coy Manh - Younger brother of Karma.
Nga Coy Manh - Younger sister of Karma.
Carter Ghazikhanian - Son of Annie Ghazikhanian; left with his mother attack of Brotherhood of Mutants.

Other students and wards of the Xavier Institute
The following students have been clearly depicted as attending the Xavier Institute since it re-opened but their squad affiliation has not been revealed. Some of these students may be a part of the Lower School or members of squads that have not been fully revealed, such as Beast's Exemplars or Iceman's Excelsiors.

Melody Guthrie - Depowered as a result of M-Day. Regained her powers after the ritual of the Crucible on Krakoa.
Amber - Depowered as a result of M-Day.
 Audio (Raymond Keyes) - Depowered as a result of M-Day. Possibly killed on a bus when it exploded.
Becky - Depowered as a result of M-Day. Possibly killed on a bus when it exploded.
Bolt (Christopher "Chris"Bradley)
Butterfly (Lucy Priest) - Depowered as a result of M-Day. Possibly killed on a bus when it exploded.
 Caput (Abraham Verne) - Depowered as a result of M-Day. Possibly killed on a bus when it exploded.
 Carter -  Depowered as a result of M-Day. Alive as taken out by X-Men.
Crater (Erik Hallgrimsson) - Depowered as a result of M-Day. Possibly killed on a bus when it exploded.
 Cephalopod (Molly Stanwick) - Depowered as a result of M-Day. Possibly killed on a bus when it exploded.
Choir	(Irina Clayton) - Depowered as a result of M-Day. Possibly killed on a bus when it exploded.
Collider (James Louis "Jim" Prindle) - Depowered as a result of M-Day. Possibly killed on a bus when it exploded.
Contact (Frida Rivera) - Depowered as a result of M-Day. Possibly killed on a bus when it exploded.
 Crater (Erik Hallgrimsson) - Depowered as a result of M-Day. Possibly killed on a bus when it exploded.
 Cudgel	(Liam Bremner) - Depowered as a result of M-Day. Possibly killed on a bus when it exploded.
Cryptid (Andy Hartnell) - Depowered as a result of M-Day. Possibly killed on a bus when it exploded.
 Devon - Depowered as a result of M-Day. Alive as taken out by X-Men.
Eleanor Sanford - Depowered as a result of M-Day. Possibly killed on a bus when it exploded.
Elsewhere (Jaime Vanderwall) - Depowered as a result of M-Day. Possibly killed on a bus when it exploded.
 Eosimias	(Hong Lianje) - Depowered as a result of M-Day. Possibly killed on a bus when it exploded but resurrected on Krakoa.
 Eve - Depowered as a result of M-Day. Alive as taken out by X-Men.
 Flood (Eugene Walker) - Depowered as a result of M-Day. Possibly killed on a bus when it exploded.
 Forearm (Marcus Tucker) - Depowered as a result of M-Day. Possibly killed on a bus when it exploded.
 Gelatin (Carlo Brewster) - Depowered as a result of M-Day. Possibly killed on a bus when it exploded.
 Gloom (Jordan Lewis) - Depowered as a result of M-Day. Possibly killed on a bus when it exploded.
 Greg	 - Depowered as a result of M-Day. Possibly killed on a bus when it exploded.
Hitch-Hiker (Connor Lauglin) - Depowered as a result of M-Day. Possibly killed on a bus when it exploded.
 Hothead (Germaine Caruso) - Killed during riots at Salem Center.
 Hydro (Noah Crichton) - Accidentally drowned after being depowered as a result of M-Day.
 Imp (Anders Nobel) - Depowered as a result of M-Day. Possibly killed on a bus when it exploded.
 Iolanthe (Katie Atkinson) - Depowered as a result of M-Day. Possibly killed on a bus when it exploded.
Jane - Depowered as a result of M-Day. Alive as taken out by X-Men.
Jeb - Romantic interest of Anne Moore. Depowered as a result of M-Day. Possibly killed on a bus when it exploded.
Jenna - Depowered as a result of M-Day. Alive as taken out by X-Men.
 Josette Francks - Depowered as a result of M-Day. Possibly killed on a bus when it exploded.
 Julie - Depowered as a result of M-Day. Possibly killed on a bus when it exploded.
 Longneck (William Hanover) - Depowered as a result of M-Day. Possibly killed on a bus when it exploded.
Kato Anishiwa - Imperial Guardsman posing as a student.
 Keratin (Dave Finn) - Depowered as a result of M-Day. Possibly killed on a bus when it exploded.
Koren - Depowered as a result of M-Day. Possibly killed on a bus when it exploded.
 Lipid (Anne Moore) - Depowered as a result of M-Day. Possibly killed on a bus when it exploded.
Melissa - Depowered as a result of M-Day. Possibly killed on a bus when it exploded.
Mentat (Robert Zepheniah) - Depowered as a result of M-Day. Possibly killed on a bus when it exploded.
Marie Jennifer D'Ancanto - Human whose family was killed by mutants. Current ward of Evangeline Whedon.
 Nancy - Depowered as a result of M-Day. Possibly killed on a bus when it exploded.
 Noah - Depowered as a result of M-Day. Possibly killed on a bus when it exploded.
 Overlay (Zach Halliwell) - Depowered as a result of M-Day. Possibly killed on a bus when it exploded.
 Pako (Cirlio Crisologo) - Depowered as a result of M-Day. Possibly killed on a bus when it exploded.
Pinocchio (Frank Ludlum) - Depowered as a result of M-Day. Possibly killed on a bus when it exploded.
 Polymer (Dana Holmes) - Depowered as a result of M-Day. Possibly killed on a bus when it exploded.
 Protozoa (Linus Sinker)  - Depowered as a result of M-Day. Possibly killed on a bus when it exploded.
 Ruth Durie - Depowered as a result of M-Day. Possibly killed on a bus when it exploded.
 Saurus (Jorge Lukas) - Depowered as a result of M-Day. Possibly killed on a bus when it exploded.
 Silicon (Stan Finch) - Depowered as a result of M-Day. Possibly killed on a bus when it exploded.
 Skylark (Greg Carlson) - Depowered as a result of M-Day. Possibly killed on a bus when it exploded.
 Skywalker - Depowered as a result of M-Day. Possibly killed on a bus when it exploded.
 Slick (Quincy Marrow) - Depowered as a result of M-Day. Possibly killed on a bus when it exploded.
Spencer Bronson - Depowered as a result of M-Day. Possibly killed on a bus when it exploded.
 Spike (Gary Walsh) - Depowered as a result of M-Day. Possibly killed on a bus when it exploded but resurrected on Krakoa.
 Spirit (Jacob Pace) - Depowered as a result of M-Day. Possibly killed on a bus when it exploded.
 Stalwart (Adewale Ekoku) - Depowered as a result of M-Day. Possibly killed on a bus when it exploded.
 Squidboy (Samuel Luc Paré) - Killed by Black Tom Cassidy.
 Tantra (Reuben O'Hara) - Depowered as a result of M-Day. Possibly killed on a bus when it exploded.
Tommy - Depowered as a result of M-Day. Alive as taken out by X-Men.
Updraft (Johan Schumann) - Depowered as a result of M-Day. Possibly killed on a bus when it exploded.
 View	 (Winston Frankowski) - Depowered as a result of M-Day. Possibly killed on a bus when it exploded.
 Viskid (Adrian Defoe) - Depowered as a result of M-Day. Possibly killed on a bus when it exploded.
 Walter Lambert - Human exchange student from Empire State University.
X-23 (Laura Kinney) (now Wolverine) - Current resident of Krakoa.

Massachusetts Academy
 Branch of Xavier's School for Gifted Youngsters.

Former Staff Members
White Queen (Emma Frost) - Headmistress.
Banshee (Sean Cassidy) - Headmaster; current a resident of Krakoa.
Andre Mexer - Janitor.

Former Student Body

Generation X
Skin (Angelo Espinosa) - Current a resident of Krakoa.
Synch (Everett Thomas) Current member of X-Men on Krakoa.
M (Monet St. Croix) - Current member of X-Corp on Krakoa.
Husk (Paige Guthrie) - Current a member of Legionaries on Krakoa.
Jubilee (Jubilation "Jubes" Lee)
Chamber (Jonothon "Jono" Starsmore) - Current member of New Mutants and Legionaries on Krakoa.
Blink (Clarice Ferguson) - Current a resident of Krakoa.
Penance
Mondo - Current member of New Mutants on Krakoa.
Gaia

Wards
Leech - Current resident of Krakoa.
Artie Maddicks - Current resident of Krakoa.
Franklin Richards - Currently residing with Fantastic Four.
M-Twins (Claudette & Nicole St. Croix) - Current resident of Krakoa.

Jean Grey School for Higher Learning
 Later renamed as Xavier Institute for Mutant Education and Outreach.

Former Staff Members
Angel (Warren Worthington III) - Graduate assistant and recruiter.
Beast (Dr. Henry "Hank" McCoy) - Vice-Principal, Science/Philosophy teacher.
Cannonball (Samuel "Sam" Guthrie) - Junior staff and flight teacher.
Chamber (Jonothon "Jono" Starsmore) - Junior staff, psychology/professional standards teacher.
Colossus (Piotr Rasputin)
Cypher (Douglas "Doug" Ramsey) - Junior staff, foreign language/communications teacher.
Deathlok - Junior Staff, Future teaching teacher.
Doop - Adjunct Staff, Introduction to religion teacher, receptionist. Current a resident of Krakoa.
Dr. Cecilia Reyes - Resident physician. Current a resident of Krakoa.
Dr. Kavita Rao - Resident physician.
Firestar (Angelica “Angel” Jones) - Joined after the Battle of the Atom. Chemistry and physics teacher. Current member of X-Men on Krakoa.
Frenzy (Joanna Cargill) - Adjunct Staff, gym teacher. Current member of S.W.O.R.D. on Krakoa.
Gambit (Remy LeBeau) - Senior staff and sex-ed teacher. Left to join X-Factor.
Husk (Paige Guthrie) - Junior Staff, former mutant art/literature teacher, school guidance councilor.
Iceman (Robert "Bobby" Drake) - Senior Staff and mathematics teacher.
Karma (Xi'an "Shan" Coy Manh) - Junior staff and librarian.
Kymera - Joined after the Battle of the Atom. Currently deceased.
Lockheed - Junior staff and alien races teacher. Left with Shadowcat to join New Charles Xavier School for Mutants. Current member of Marauders on Krakoa.
Marvel Girl (Rachel Grey) (now Prestige) - Senior Staff, psychic defense/space survival teacher. Current a resident of Krakoa.
M (Monet St. Croix)
Mimic (Calvin Rankin) - Junior staff. Left after the war between Avengers and X-Men. Current a resident of Krakoa.
Nightcrawler (Kurt Wagner)
Professor X (Charles Xavier) - Senior staff.
Psylocke (Elizabeth "Betsy" Braddock) (now Captain Britain) - Fired by Wolverine because of reacting aggressively to students' thoughts. Current member of Excalibur on Krakoa.
Rogue (Anna Marie) - Senior staff and linguistics teacher.
Shadowcat (Katherine "Kitty" Pryde) - Former headmistress, later Senior staff, ethics/computer science/future history teacher, left after the Battle of the Atom to join New Charles Xavier School for Mutants.
Storm (Ororo Munroe) - Headmistress and multi-cultural teacher.
Toad (Mortimer Toynbee) - Janitor; left with Dr. Frankenstein. Current a resident of Krakoa.
Warbird (Ava'Dara Naganandini) - Junior staff and school protector.
Wolverine (James Howlett/Logan) - Headmaster, history teacher and combat instructor.

Former Student Body

Founding students
Anole (Victor "Vic" Borkowski)
Armor (Hisako Ichiki)
Blindfold (Ruth Aldine)
Bling! (Roxanne "Roxy" Washington)
Broo - Current a resident of Krakoa.
Cipher (Alisa Tager) - Current a resident of Krakoa.
Ernst
Gentle (Nezhno Abidemi)
Glob Herman
Graymalkin (Jonas Graymalkin) - Current a resident of Krakoa.
Hellion (Julian Keller)
Indra (Paras Gavaskar)
Kid Gladiator (Kubark) - son of Imperial Guard member Kallark, a.k.a. Gladiator. Current a resident of Krakoa and also Shi'ar Empire.
Kid Omega (Quintavius "Quentine" Quire)
Match (Benjamin "Ben" Hammil)
Mercury (Cessily Kincaid)
Oya (Idie Okonkwo) - Current a resident of Krakoa.
Rockslide (Santo Vaccarro)
Trance (Hope Abbott)

Later enrolled
Angel (Warren Worthington III)
Boo - Brought in by Magik and Shadowcat.
Crosta - Atlantean heritage; current a resident of Krakoa.
Dust (Sooraya Qadir)
Dr. Frankenstein (Maximilian "Max" Frankenstein/Baron Maximilian von Katzenelnbogen) - Current member of Homines Verendi on Madripoor.
Eye Boy (Trevor Hawkins) - Mutant who manifested his powers after the event of Avengers vs. X-Men. Current member of X-Factor Investigations on Krakoa.
Face - Former Inferno baby.
Flourish/Creep (Marisol Guerra) - Brought in by Storm. Left to return Mexico.
Genesis (Evan Sabahnur) - Clone of Apocalypse. Currently deceased.
Goldballs (Fabio Medina) (now Egg) - Mutant who manifested his powers after the event of Avengers vs. X-Men. Current member of the Five on Krakoa.
Hijack (David Bond) - Mutant who manifested his powers after the event of Avengers vs. X-Men. Transferred from New Charles Xavier School for Mutants after it shut down.
Hindsight (Nathaniel Carver)
Hope Summers - Omega-level mutant; current member of the Five on Krakoa.
Ink (Eric Gitter) - Current a resident of Krakoa.
Julie Harison
Karasu-Tengu
Manuel Enduque - Current member of Homines Verendi on Madripoor
Metus
Michaela Ladak - Brought in by Iceman.
Morph (Benjamin "Ben" Deeds) - Mutant who manifested his powers after the event of Avengers vs. X-Men. Transferred from New Charles Xavier School for Mutants after it shut down.
Mukus
Nature Girl (Lin Li) - Current member of X-Men Green.
No-Girl (Martha Johansson)
Oscar - Killed by X-Cutioner.
Pixie (Megan Gwynn)
Primal (Teon Macik) - Current a resident of Krakoa.
Scorpion Boy (Rico)
Sapna - Brought in by Magik; currently deceased.
Shark-Girl (Iara Dos Santos) - Mutant who manifested her powers after the event of Avengers vs. X-Men. Current a resident of Krakoa.
Sojobo-Tengu (possessed by Luca Aldine)
Sprite (Jia Jing) - Mutant who manifested her powers after the event of Avengers vs. X-Men. Current a resident of Krakoa.
Stepford Cuckoos/Three-In-One - Left to join Cyclops's New Charles Xavier School for Mutants but later rejoined after it shut down.
Celeste Cuckoo
Irma "Mindee" Cuckoo
Phoebe Cuckoo
Squidface (Josephine Brickelmoore) - Human pretending to be a mutant. Actually a mole for the S.H.I.E.L.D. and Mystique.
Surge (Nori Ashida)
Time-Displaced Original X-Men - The five original X-Men who came from the 1960s. Left to join Cyclops's New Charles Xavier School for Mutants. Currently back in their timeline.
Angel (Warren Worthington III) - Past Version
Beast (Henry "Hank" McCoy) - Past Version
Cyclops (Scott Summers) - Past Version
Iceman (Robert "Bobby" Drake) - Past Version
Marvel Girl (Jean Grey) - Past Version
Transonic (Laurie Tromette) - Current a resident of Krakoa.
Tri-Joey (Joseph Brickelmoore) - Human pretending to be a mutant. Actually a mole for the S.H.I.E.L.D. and Mystique.
Triage (Christopher "Chris" Muse) - Mutant who manifested his powers after the event of Avengers vs. X-Men. Transferred from New Charles Xavier School for Mutants after it shut down. Current a resident of Krakoa.
Velocidad (Gabriel Cohuelo) - Currently deceased.
Ziggy Karst - Brought in by Nightcrawler.

New Charles Xavier School for Mutants

Former Staff Members
Cyclops (Scott Summers) - Headmaster.
White Queen (Emma Frost) - Headmistress.
Dazzler (Alison Blaire) - Current resident of Krakoa.
Lockheed
Magik (Illyana Rasputina)
Magneto (Max Eisenhardt/Erik "Magnus" Lehnsherr)
Shadowcat (Katherine "Kitty" Pryde) - Mentor to time-displaced X-Men.

Former Student Body
Egg/Goldballs (Fabio Medina) - Later joined Jean Grey School.
Hijack (David Bond) - Later Joined Jean Grey School.
Morph (Benjamin "Ben" Deeds) - Later joined Jean Grey School.
Stepford Cuckoos/Three-In-One - Rejoined Jean Grey School.
Celeste Cuckoo
Irma "Mindee" Cuckoo
Phoebe Cuckoo
Tempus (Eva Bell) - Mutant who manifested her powers after the event of Avengers vs. X-Men. Current member of the Five on Krakoa.
Time-Displaced Original X-Men
Angel (Warren Worthington III) - Past Version
Beast (Henry "Hank" McCoy) - Past Version
Cyclops (Scott Summers) - Past Version
Iceman (Robert "Bobby" Drake) - Past Version
Marvel Girl (Jean Grey) - Past Version
Triage (Christopher "Chris" Muse) - Later joined Jean Grey School.
X-23 (Laura Kinney)

See also
List of X-Men members

References

Xavier
Xavier
Xavier Institute students and staff